Munira Fakhro is a Bahraini academic and was a candidate in Bahrain's 2006 general election for the opposition Waad.

Dr Fakhro is Associate Professor at the University of Bahrain, having received her Doctorate in Social Policy, Planning and Administration from Columbia University where she has served as a visiting scholar since 1997. She has also conducted research on gender, citizenship and civil society in the Persian Gulf states at the Centre for Middle East Studies, Harvard University. She has published works on Bahrain, including issues related to women, civil society and democratisation. Dr. Fakhro is also currently a board member of the Bahrain Academic Society and the Supreme Council for Women. She was a member of the Advisory Board for the Arab Human Development Report 2004.

During the 1990s Uprising, Dr Fakhro was a signatory to the 1994 Popular Petition to the Amir calling for the restoration of the parliament and the 1973 constitution. This was followed by another petition in 1995 signed by 350 women calling for the restoration of democracy and an end to torture. As a result, the government of Bahrain demanded that she withdraw her name or be sacked from her position at the University of Bahrain. She refused to withdraw her name and was sacked along with several other of the signatories. However, King Hamad acceded to the throne he carried out a general amnesty for all political prisoners and exiles, and Dr Fakhro was restored to her job at Bahrain University. Dr Fakhro was appointed by the King's wife, Sheikha Sabeeka bint Ibrahim Al Khalifa, to the Advisory Board of the Supreme Council for Women.

2006 Bahrain parliamentary elections

Dr Fakhro ran for election in parliamentary elections that was held in Bahrain on 25 November 2006. She is Vice President of the leftist Waad, and is the only female candidate to be endorsed by Shia Islamist party, Al Wefaq. Dr Fakhro is standing in the middle class Isa Town constituency where she is running against Dr Salah Ali MP, who is a member of the Muslim Brotherhood's political wing, Al-Menbar Islamic Society.

On the issue of women's rights, Dr Fakhro has argued that it is a core component of democracy: “You cannot separate democracy from other women’s causes … I believe that men and women should work together – for women or men or the whole society. We have so many men who believe in such issues (women’s rights), who work with us either at the university as scholars or at the political association.” Her views on women's rights mean that she has clashed with Islamists over their opposition to a unified law to protect women's rights: “Religious leaders are against the family law. I am against two separate laws for the Sunni and Shia – we will be separated more.”

“If you want to fight extremism, you have to have a strong government. Democracy will bring extremists in, but in a controlled way – like Hamas in Palestine and the Muslim Brothers in Egypt. There are so many grey areas in democracy, but you must accommodate every group. This is a positive policy. They have to deal with things legally. I think things are moving towards such partial openness.”

She described her appointment by Shaikha Sabeeka bint Ibrahim Al Khalifa, wife of King Hamad, to the Supreme Council for Women as “I think we are at the beginning of this movement in civil society. In the Council, we have a good strategy. To apply it will take a long time by I think it should involve all women’s associations.”

On 22 October, the Khaleej Times reported that female candidates in the 2006 elections were receiving anonymous threats and mobile phone messages telling them to withdraw to 'avoid clashing with Islamic principles'. Dr Fakhro complained to the Supreme Council for Women and the Ministry of Islamic Affairs about the texts, and alleged that they are coming from Salafi circles strongly opposed to women's participation . Bahraini Salafist party, Asalah, is opposed to women standing for parliament.

See also
National Democratic Action
University of Bahrain
Women's political rights in Bahrain
Bahrain election 2006 women candidates
Layla Fakhro
Ibrahim Sharif

External links
NATO conference profile
A Rebel With a Cause, Woman This Month interview, April 2006
The Voice of Common Man, Bahrain Tribune profile, 14 October 2006

Harvard University people
Bahraini left-wing activists
Living people
Year of birth missing (living people)
Bahraini women in politics
Bahraini women's rights activists
National Democratic Action Society politicians
People of the Bahraini uprising of 2011
Academic staff of the University of Bahrain
Columbia University School of Social Work alumni
21st-century Bahraini women politicians
21st-century Bahraini politicians